Harding is an unincorporated community in Tift County, in the U.S. state of Georgia.

History
A post office called Harding was established in 1896, and remained in operation until 1901. According to tradition, the toponym Harding is a transfer from Massachusetts.

References

Unincorporated communities in Tift County, Georgia